Giovanni Girgenti (born 18 December 1942) is an Italian boxer. He competed in the men's featherweight event at the 1964 Summer Olympics.

References

External links
 

1942 births
Living people
Italian male boxers
Olympic boxers of Italy
Boxers at the 1964 Summer Olympics
People from Marsala
Featherweight boxers
Sportspeople from the Province of Trapani
20th-century Italian people